General L. D. E. Cecil Waidyaratne, VSV, USP (16 May 1938 – 18 December 2001) was a Sri Lanka Army officer. He was 12th Commander of the Sri Lankan Army and a former  Sri Lankan Ambassador to Thailand.

Education
Educated at St. Benedict's College, Colombo, where he played for the college cricket team.

Military career

Early career
Waidyaratne joined the Ceylon Army on 26 June 1959, as a cadet officer and received his officer training at the Royal Military Academy, Sandhurst. On 28 July 1961, he was commissioned as a second lieutenant in the 1st Reconnaissance Regiment, Ceylon Armoured Corps. He served with the 1st Reconnaissance Regiment during the 1971 JVP insurrection and in 1973, he attended the Defence Services Staff College in Wellington gaining his psc qualification.

Field command
On January 1, 1980, he was promoted to the rank of lieutenant colonel and was appointed commanding officer of the Sri Lanka Electrical and Mechanical Engineers when fraud and robbery was reported in army workshops. In March 1981, he was appointed commanding officer of the 1st Battalion, Sri Lanka Sinha Regiment and tasked with undertaking disciplinary action following a clash between Sinha Regiment troops and police officers of the Fort Police Station on 20 January that year. He was thereafter appointed commanding officer of the 1st Reconnaissance Regiment, Sri Lanka Armoured Corps from July 1982 to June 1983. In May 1983, he was then sent to take control of what the army command thought of a possible mutiny in the Rajarata Rifles. Taking command of the Rajarata Rifles, Colonel Waidyaratne had it disbanded, retrained and merged its remaining officers and men with that of the Vijayabahu Infantry Regiment in October 1983 to form the Gajaba Regiment under the command of Lieutenant Colonel Vijaya Wimalaratne.

Higher command
In 1985, he became the Commander Northern Area and thereafter Commander Southern Area before becoming the General Officer Commanding, 1 Division. In 1988, he attended the National Security and Strategic Study course at the National Defence College, India. In 1989, he was promoted to the rank of major general and appointed Chief of Staff of the Army. In August 1989, amidst of the second JVP insurrection in the southern parts of the island, Waidyaratne was appointed concurrently as the Commander of Operation Combine with responsibility for the security of Colombo Metropolitan area. He led the Operation Combine to systematically suppress the military branch of the JVP, the DJP with brutal counter-insurgency operations which lead to the end of the second JVP insurrection following the death of its leader Rohana Wijeweera in November 1989.

Commander of the Sri Lankan Army
On 16 November 1991, he was promoted to lieutenant general and was appointed as Commander of the Sri Lanka Army. Taking command of the army during the Eelam War II phase of the Sri Lankan Civil War, Waidyaratne introduced a program of re-training and re-equipping to face the conventional warfare tactics adopted by the LTTE with the First Battle of Elephant Pass. He proposed a long term strategy to defeat the LTTE aimed at defeating the LTTE in the Eastern Province and thereafter bringing overwhelming force to bare on LTTE controlled areas in the Northern Province. However, the LTTE was able to keep the army on the defensive by ambushing its patrols and launching attacks on isolated detachments like in the case of the Battle of Janakapura and the Battle of Pooneryn. Following Pooneryn, Waidyaratne resigned on 31 December 1993, and was promoted to General on 1 January 1994 and retired from the army. He was succeeded by Major General G. H. De Silva.

Honors
He had been awarded the Vishista Seva Vibhushanaya (VSV) for distinguished service, his other medals include the Sri Lanka Army 25th Anniversary Medal, Ceylon Armed Services Long Service Medal, Sri Lanka Armed Services Long Service Medal, President's Inauguration Medal, Purna Bhumi Padakkama.

Later life
Following his retirement he was appointed Sri Lankan Ambassador to Thailand and held the post till December 1994. He died on 18 December 2001, while undergoing medical treatment in India.

Family
He married Thileka Jayewardene, daughter of Major T. F. Jayewardene.

References

1938 births
2001 deaths
Commanders of the Sri Lanka Army
Sri Lankan full generals
Graduates of the Royal Military Academy Sandhurst
Ambassadors of Sri Lanka to Thailand
Sinhalese military personnel
Sri Lanka Armoured Corps officers